Statistics of Úrvalsdeild in the 1943 season.

Overview
It was contested by 5 teams, and Valur won the championship. KR's Jón Jónasson was the top scorer with 5 goals.

League standings

Results

References

Úrvalsdeild karla (football) seasons
Iceland
Iceland
Urvalsdeild